In theoretical computer science, a crossing sequence at boundary i, denoted as  or sometimes , is the sequence of states  of a Turing machine on input x, such that in this sequence of states, the head crosses between cell i and i + 1 (note that the first crossing is always a right crossing, and the next left, and so on...)

Sometimes, crossing sequence is considered as the sequence of configurations, which represent the three elements: the states, the contents of the tapes and the positions of the heads.

Study of crossing sequences is carried out, e.g., in computational complexity theory.

Turing machine